"Do I Wanna Know?" is a song by English rock band Arctic Monkeys written by Alex Turner. It was released on 19 June 2013 by Domino Recording Company as the second single from their fifth studio album, AM (2013). It received a digital download release through iTunes as well as an accompanying music video. Before its release as a single, the song was premiered by the band live in May 2013 on the AM Tour, where it was often played as the opening number. It is an indie rock, psychedelic rock, stoner rock and blues rock song, and is built around a stomping guitar riff.

"Do I Wanna Know?" peaked at number 11 in the UK Singles Chart, charted in several other countries and was the first Arctic Monkeys song to have ever entered the Billboard Hot 100 chart in the United States, peaking at number 70 in March 2014. The song was nominated for Best Rock Performance at the 57th Annual Grammy Awards in 2015. In December 2019, the song was ranked number three on Guitar Worlds list of the 20 best guitar riffs of the decade.

Composition 
"Do I Wanna Know?" is performed in the key of G minor. Musically, it has been described as an indie rock, psychedelic rock, stoner rock, blues rock and alternative rock song. The song has a similar aesthetic style and lyrical content to their 2012 song "R U Mine?"; it is more downtempo while having similar guitar riffs.
PopMatters describes it as "a cleaner, slower-burning 'R U Mine?'", while also finding its "stomping" style to be a "steadier take" on the music found on Humbug (2009). The song also contains the edgier sound found on their previous album Suck It and See (2011). In concert, singer and guitarist Alex Turner uses a Vox 12-string electric guitar.

Structurally, the song follows a common pop music "verse-pre-chorus-chorus" form up until its second chorus; from that point on, it follows what Hit Songs Deconstructed calls "a more unorthodox flow" ending in a "pre-chorus/chorus hybrid section". Falsetto backing vocals are also blended with those of Turner's throughout the song. Moreover, the title encapsulates the entire premise of the story, the narrator wondering whether he wants to remain in doubt or know if his feelings are unrequited or mutual.

Release and reception
"Do I Wanna Know" was first played live on 22 May 2013 in Ventura, California at the first concert of the band's AM Tour. Throughout the tour, the song was being played as the opening number. It was then released as AMs second single on 19 June 2013, appearing in digital download formats through iTunes. It was accompanied by a music video released on YouTube. The single was released with no promotion, allowing fans to purchase it through iTunes immediately. A 7-inch vinyl edition of the single was released on 22 July 2013, with a B-side titled "2013". On AM, "Do I Wanna Know?" appears as the opening track.

Rolling Stone ranked "Do I Wanna Know?" as the tenth best song of 2013, calling it "the highlight of the U.K. crew's soul-rock overhaul album AM." The song was nominated for Best Rock Performance at the 57th Annual Grammy Awards in 2015, losing to "Lazaretto" by Jack White. In December 2019, the song was ranked number three on Guitar Worlds list of the 20 best guitar riffs of the decade. NME later ranked the song as the fifth best song of the 2010s decade.

Commercial performance 
Despite a midweek on air on sale release, the song entered the UK Singles Chart at number 11, making it the band's highest-charting single since "Fluorescent Adolescent" in 2007. This was subsequently outperformed by the next single "Why'd You Only Call Me When You're High?", which debuted at number eight. "Do I Wanna Know?" has spent 65 weeks in the UK top 100, this being the longest run of any Arctic Monkeys single, to date. The single was awarded a platinum certification by the BPI on 7 February 2015, indicating shipments in excess of 600,000 units; it is the first Arctic Monkeys single to do so.

The song had moderate success worldwide, charting in countries such as Australia, France, Belgium, Ireland and Israel. In January 2014, the song reached number one on the Billboard Alternative Songs chart, the group's first number one single in the United States and their first appearance on that chart since "I Bet You Look Good on the Dancefloor" peaked at number seven in 2006. On 28 March, the track became the 30th song to have occupied the Billboard Alternative Songs chart top spot for 10 weeks or more. As of the 25 October 2014 issue of Billboard, it logged 58 weeks on the Alternative Songs list, making it the second-longest running song on the chart. It also became the band's first single to appear on the Billboard Hot 100 chart, peaking at number 70 in March 2014. On 26 January 2014, the song reached number four on Triple J's Hottest 100 of 2013, and, on 14 March 2020, reached number three on Triple J's Hottest 100 of 2010s.

Music video 
The music video for "Do I Wanna Know?", directed by David Wilson with animation agency Blinkink, was first released onto YouTube on 18 June 2013. As of June 2020, it has been viewed over 1 billion times, becoming one of only 12 rock videos to achieve this feat. The video begins with a black background and simple visuals of white sound waves (similar to the AM cover art) that vibrate in synchronisation, first with the percussion and lead guitar, then with the lead singer, Alex Turner. As the band enters with the chorus, coloured sound waves illustrate new voices. Simple sound waves then give way to fast-moving, representational line-drawing animations that morph between a variety of female, race car, race car engine, and road racing images. At one point, the undulating white line becomes the "trucker's Mudflap girl", seen in the single's cover art. The line drawings are interrupted several times with flashes of full-color animation, several that recall the surrealistic style of Robert Crumb. The increasingly complex video creates, by turns, a somewhat jarring and psychedelic experience, in a style not unlike the Gary Gutierrez animations that were featured in The Grateful Dead Movie (1977). The video ends with the familiar white line becoming two crossed checkered flags, which join together in a single line with the "AM" initials.

In popular culture 
"Do I Wanna Know?" was used in a 2013 Bacardi commercial. In September 2014, the song was used in the pilot episode of ABC's TV series Forever, and the fifth episode of Israeli series Ish Hashuv Meod.

An instrumental version of the song is used in the second season finale of the BBC series Peaky Blinders.

The song has been covered by artists such as MS MR, Sam Smith, Chvrches,  Hozier, Dua Lipa, and Christina Grimmie.

The song was also present in Ubisoft's 2014 game, The Crew  as one of the songs in the in-game radio.

Track listing

Personnel 
Adapted from the CD single liner notes.

Arctic Monkeys
Alex Turner – lead vocals, twelve-string electric guitar
Jamie Cook – lead guitar
Nick O'Malley – bass guitar, backing vocals
Matt Helders – drums, electronic drums, percussion, backing vocals

Additional personnel 
James Ford – production; keyboards 
Ross Orton – production
Ian Shea – engineering
Tchad Blake – mixing 
Brian Lucey – mastering

Charts

Weekly charts

Year-end charts

Decade-end charts

Certifications

Release history

References 

2013 songs
2013 singles
Arctic Monkeys songs
Domino Recording Company singles
Music videos directed by David Wilson (director)
Songs written by Alex Turner (musician)
Stoner rock songs
Animated music videos